La Sicilia is an Italian daily newspaper for the island of Sicily. Published in Catania, it is the second best-selling newspaper in Sicily. It was first published in 1945.

History and profile
La Sicilia was founded and first published in 1945, and legally registered at the court of Catania three years later. The paper had a conservative stance.

The circulation of La Sicilia was 64,550 copies in 2008.

See also 
Giornale di Sicilia
Quotidiano di Sicilia

Notes

External links
 Official website

1945 establishments in Italy
Newspapers established in 1945
Italian-language newspapers
Daily newspapers published in Italy
Mass media in Catania
Sicily